Xie Chen is a Chinese physicist and a professor of theoretical physics at the California Institute of Technology. Her work covers both the field of condensed matter physics and quantum information, with a focus on many-body quantum mechanical systems with unconventional emergent phenomena. She won the 2020 New Horizons in Physics Prize for "incisive contributions to the understanding of topological states of matter and the relationships between them"

Early life and education 
Chen received her bachelor's degree in physics from Tsinghua University in 2006 and her Ph.D. in theoretical physics from Massachusetts Institute of Technology in 2012 under the supervision of Isaac Chuang and Xiao-Gang Wen. From 2012–2014, Chen was a Miller Research Fellow in University of California, Berkeley. In 2014, she joined California Institute of Technology as an assistant professor and in 2017 she was promoted to associate professor.

Research 
Chen's research centers on novel phases and phase transitions in quantum condensed matter systems. Her major research topics include topological order in strongly correlated systems, dynamics in many-body systems, tensor network representation, and quantum information application.

Awards and honors 
 Simons Investigator (2021)
New Horizons in Physics Prize (2020)
Sloan Research Fellowship (2017)
National Science Foundation Faculty Early Career Award (2017)
 Miller Research Fellowship, UC Berkeley (2012)
 Outstanding Chinese Self-financed Students Abroad (one of nine extraordinary prizewinners, 2012)
 Andrew M. Lockett III Memorial Fund Award for best theoretical physics graduate student at MIT (2011)
 Whiteman Fellowship for graduate study of physics at MIT (2006)

References 

Living people
Year of birth missing (living people)
Chinese women physicists
Tsinghua University alumni
MIT Department of Physics alumni
California Institute of Technology faculty
Theoretical physicists
Chinese expatriates in the United States
Sloan Research Fellows